William Alfred Apps (born 1957) is a Canadian lawyer, businessman and prominent activist in both the Liberal Party of Canada and the Ontario Liberal Party. Apps is associated with a number of philanthropic and charitable causes and is currently based in Toronto.

Education
Alfred Apps was born in Brantford, Ontario, in 1957, the son of Arthur Carlyle Apps (1933 - 2022) and Margaret Imogene (Gracey) Apps (1932–2005), the eldest of seven children. He spent his formative years in Woodstock, Ontario and attended high school at Woodstock Collegiate Institute.

In 1979, he obtained his BA (Hons) in philosophy and economics from Huron University College at the University of Western Ontario. He graduated in law from the University of Toronto in 1984 and was called to the Ontario bar in 1987. Apps served as Prime Minister of his high school students' council in 1974–75 and as President of both the Huron College Student's Council in 1978–1979. and of the University Students' Council in 1979–1980. He was the recipient of the 2017 Alumni Award of Distinction from Huron University College.

Business background
Apps joined Fasken as an associate in 1989 and was named partner in 1991. In 1993, he withdrew from the partnership on being named CEO of The Lehndorff Group (an international commercial real estate firm with assets in Canada, the United States and Europe), where he led a 47-lender $1 billion debt restructuring and oversaw the creation of one of Canada's first Real Estate Investment Trusts; ResREIT which merged into CAPREIT in 2004.

In 1998 he led a business combination between Lehndorff and Dundee Realty Corporation (now Dream ) and, following a short period as President and COO of the successor corporation, was appointed CEO of Newstar Technologies Inc. In 2001, upon completing a merger of Newstar with three of its principal U.S. competitors together with a US$140 million first-round equity financing, he rejoined the partnership at Fasken Martineau, practiced corporate/commercial law specializing in corporate mergers, acquisitions and financings. In 2012, he then moved his practice to Wildeboer Dellelce LLP, a corporate, securities and tax firm he helped found in 1993. In 2015, he moved his practice to Miller Thomson LLP where he is head of the firm's national structured finance and securitization practice.

Over his career, Apps has led companies and raised capital in Canada, the United States and Europe. He also serves and has served on the Board of Directors of a number of public and private companies.

Legal practice
Apps has been recognized as a leading counsel in the area of restructuring, mergers and acquisitions, private equity investment and infrastructure finance. He has been ranked by Lexpert and UK-based Practical Law Company as one of Canada's leading lawyers in these fields. In 2009, he acted as debtor counsel in the $32BN restructuring of the Canadian third party (i.e. non-bank) asset-backed commercial paper market, the largest debt restructuring in Canadian history.

Political involvement
Although involved politically from the age of 15, Apps first came to prominence within the Liberal party in 1979 when, at age 22, he was elected Executive Vice-President of the Ontario Liberal Party. As a young Liberal, he also was involved in launching the reform movement of the Liberal Party at the national biennial convention of 1982, which culminated in the National Reform Convention of the Liberal Party, held in Halifax in 1985.

In 1984, he was appointed chief Ontario organizer for the successful John Turner leadership campaign. While studying law, he was a speechwriter for David Peterson, then Leader of the Opposition in Ontario, as well as for several cabinet ministers in the last Canadian government led by Pierre Trudeau.

Apps ran as a Liberal in his home riding of Oxford in the federal elections of both 1984 and 1988 but was defeated by the long-serving Progressive Conservative incumbent, Bruce Halliday, losing by less than 3% of the vote in 1988.

During the 1993 federal election, Apps worked closely with Senator David Smith as election readiness chair for the Greater Toronto Area, an election in which the Liberal Party won every Toronto seat. He has played a key role in recruiting a number of prominent Liberal politicians into public life including former Prime Minister Paul Martin, former Liberal Leader Michael Ignatieff and the first female black Member of Parliament and Cabinet Minister, Jean Augustine. He was also a backer of Ignatieff's 2006 and 2008 Liberal leadership bids.

On March 31, 2009, he was acclaimed as President of the Liberal Party of Canada.  As President, he was responsible for guiding the party through the first phase of rebuilding following the May 2, 2011 general election and was responsible for the publication of the Party's "Roadmap to Renewal", together with a paper entitled "Building a Modern Liberal Party". His term concluded at the Liberal Biennial Convention in Ottawa on January 15, 2012 where party members approved several modernizing reforms to the party's structure as well as a policy resolution to legalize the use of cannabis. He was succeeded by Mike Crawley who was elected in a very competitive 5-way race, defeating former Deputy Prime Minister Sheila Copps.

Other affiliations and activities
In addition to being a longtime member of the Huron University College Corporation, Apps served as Chair of the Foundation Board for the Centre for Addiction and Mental Health in 2006–2007. He was President of the Empire Club of Canada for the 2009 – 2010 year  and has been active in a number of arts and youth-oriented charities. An active Anglican, he also served on committees of the Provincial Synod Executive Council of the Ecclesiastical Province of Ontario.

References

External links

1957 births
Lawyers in Ontario
Living people
Canadian Anglicans
Candidates in the 1984 Canadian federal election
Candidates in the 1988 Canadian federal election
University of Toronto Faculty of Law alumni
University of Toronto alumni
University of Western Ontario alumni
Politicians from Brantford
People from Woodstock, Ontario
Presidents of the Liberal Party of Canada
Liberal Party of Canada candidates for the Canadian House of Commons